Alphonse John Barrington (c.1832–15 December 1893) was a New Zealand gold prospector and explorer. He was born c.1832.

References

1832 births
1893 deaths
New Zealand gold prospectors
People of the Otago Gold Rush